This is a list of broadcast television stations that are licensed in the U.S. state of Virginia.

See also List of television stations in Washington, D.C.

Full-power stations
VC refers to the station's PSIP virtual channel. RF refers to the station's physical RF channel.

Defunct full-power stations
Including full-power construction permits that were awarded but returned or canceled before starting broadcasts.

LPTV stations

Translators

See also
 Virginia media
 List of newspapers in Virginia
 List of radio stations in Virginia
 Media of cities in Virginia: Chesapeake, Hampton, Newport News, Norfolk, Richmond, Roanoke, Virginia Beach

References

Bibliography

External links
 
  (Directory ceased in 2017)
 Virginia Association of Broadcasters

Virginia

Television stations